is the eleventh studio album by Japanese rock band Radwimps and the soundtrack for the 2019 Japanese animated film Weathering with You. It was released worldwide on July 19, 2019, the day of the movie's release by EMI Records and Universal.

Background 
On August 26, 2017, director Makoto Shinkai sent the script of the movie to vocalist Yojiro Noda for his opinions before he received the song  from Radwimps, which is used as the film's theme song. Another song, features Toko Miura's vocal.

Track listing

Complete version
Weathering with You Complete Version was released on November 27, 2019. The album's international edition features an English version of "Is There Still Anything That Love Can Do?".

Track listing

Charts

Weekly charts

Year-end charts

Charted songs

Certifications and sales

Accolades

Notes

References

External links
 

Animated film soundtracks
Radwimps albums
Anime soundtracks
Universal Music Japan albums
2019 soundtrack albums
EMI Records soundtracks
Universal Music Group soundtracks